Steve or Steven Freeman may refer to:

Steve Freeman (American football) (born 1953), American defensive back
Steve Freeman (footballer), English midfielder during 1986–2003
Steve Freeman (soccer) (born 1975), American midfielder during 1992–2003
Steven Freeman, lead character in 1993's Jason Goes to Hell: The Final Friday

See also
Stephen Friedman (disambiguation)